Heterorepetobasidium is a genus of fungi of uncertain familial placement (incertae sedis) in the order Auriculariales. The genus is widespread, especially in tropical regions, and contains two Taiwanese species, H. ellipsoideum and H. subglobosum.

References

External links

Auriculariales
Agaricomycetes genera
Taxa named by Franz Oberwinkler
Taxa described in 2002